Hypsoblennius exstochilus, commonly known as the longhorn blenny, is a species of combtooth blenny found in the western-central Atlantic Ocean.  This species grows to a length of  TL.

Adults in this species tend to inhabit rocky shallow areas. This species also exhibits an oviparous life cycle with distinct partner mating.

References

exstochilus
Fish described in 1959